Capel Parc is a hamlet in the  community of Rhosybol, Ynys Môn, Wales, which is 138.6 miles (223 km) from Cardiff and 218.4 miles (351.5 km) from London.

To the south of the village is Melin Esgob (an early 19th century water corn mill), which is a Grade II listed building.

See also
List of localities in Wales by population

References

Villages in Anglesey